Budakeszi is a district in western part of Pest County. Budakeszi is also the name of the town where the district seat is found. The district is located in the Central Hungary Statistical Region.

Geography 
Budakeszi District borders with Pilisvörösvár District to the north, Budapest to the east, Érd District to the south, Bicske District (Fejér County) to the west, Tatabánya District (Komárom-Esztergom County) to the northwest. The number of the inhabited places in Budakeszi District is 12.

Municipalities 
The district has 4 towns, 1 large village and 7 villages.
(ordered by population, as of 1 January 2013)

The municipalities in bold are cities, the municipality in italics is a large village.

Demographics

In 2011, it had a population of 83,670 and the population density was 290/km².

Ethnicity
Besides Hungarian majority, the main minorities are the German (approx. 3,700), Roma and Romanian (400), Russian (250) and Slovak (150).

Total population (2011 census): 83,670
Ethnic groups (2011 census): Identified themselves: 79,752 persons:
Hungarians: 72,343 (90.71%)
Germans: 3,702 (4.64%)
Others and indefinable: 3,707 (4.64%)
Approx. 4,000 persons in Budakeszi District did not declare their ethnic group at the 2011 census.

Religion
Religious adherence in the county according to 2011 census:

Catholic – 29,681 (Roman Catholic – 28,763; Greek Catholic – 904);
Reformed – 9,708;
Evangelical – 1,160;
Orthodox – 123;
Judaism – 164;
other religions – 1,934; 
Non-religious – 14,614; 
Atheism – 2,060;
Undeclared – 24,226.

Gallery

See also
List of cities and towns in Hungary

References

External links
 Postal codes of the Budakeszi District

Districts in Pest County